Ramaria botrytoides is a species of coral fungus in the family Gomphaceae. First described by American mycologist Charles Horton Peck in 1905 as Clavaria botryoides, it was transferred to the genus Ramaria in 1950 by E.J.H. Corner. Found in the eastern United States, it resembles Ramaria botrytis, but can be most reliably distinguished from that species by the lack of longitudinal striations in its spores.

References

External links

Gomphaceae
Fungi described in 1905
Fungi of the United States
Taxa named by Charles Horton Peck
Fungi without expected TNC conservation status